Javier Barranco Cosano (born 17 November 1998) is a Spanish tennis player.

Barranco Cosano has a career high ATP singles ranking of 262 achieved on 4 April 2022 and a career high ATP doubles ranking of 258 achieved on 12 November 2018.

Futures/ITF World Tennis Tour and Challenger finals

Singles: 20 (12–8)

References

External links

1998 births
Living people
Sportspeople from Almería
Tennis players from Andalusia
Spanish male tennis players